Ben Ray Luján (born June 7, 1972) is an American politician who has served as the junior United States senator from New Mexico since 2021. He served as a member of the New Mexico Public Regulation Commission from 2005 to 2008, where he also served as chairman.

Luján was selected as chairman of the Democratic Congressional Campaign Committee (DCCC) in 2014 and led the Democrats to win a House majority in the 2018 elections. He was the first Hispanic to serve in this role. In his role as assistant House Democratic leader, Luján was the highest-ranking Latino in Congress.

On April 1, 2019, Luján announced his intention to seek the United States Senate seat being vacated by two-term Democratic incumbent Tom Udall in the 2020 election. He defeated Republican Mark Ronchetti in the general election on November 3, 2020, and took office on January 3, 2021.

Early life and education
Ben Ray Luján was born in Santa Fe, New Mexico, as the last child of Carmen (Ray) and Ben Luján; he has two older sisters and an older brother. He was raised in Nambe, New Mexico. His father, Ben, went into politics in 1970, when he was elected to the County Commission. From 1975, he was a longtime member of the New Mexico House of Representatives, serving as majority whip and Speaker of the House.

After graduating from Pojoaque Valley High School, Ben Ray worked as a blackjack dealer at a Lake Tahoe casino and a Northern New Mexico tribal casino. After his stint as a dealer, he attended the University of New Mexico and later received a BBA degree from New Mexico Highlands University.

Early career

Public Regulation Commission 
Luján was elected to the New Mexico Public Regulation Commission in November 2004. He represented PRC district 3 which encompasses northeastern, north central and central New Mexico. His served as chairman of the PRC in 2005, 2006 and 2007. His term on the PRC ended at the end of 2008. He helped to increase the Renewable Portfolio Standard in New Mexico that requires utilities to use 20 percent of their energy from renewable sources by 2020. Luján also required utilities to diversify their renewable use to include solar, wind and biomass.

Luján joined regulators in California, Oregon, and Washington to sign the Joint Action Framework on Climate Change to implement regional solutions to global warming.

U.S. House of Representatives

Elections

2008 

In 2008, Luján ran to succeed U.S. Representative Tom Udall in New Mexico's 3rd congressional district. Udall gave up the seat to make what would be a successful bid for the United States Senate. On June 3, 2008, Luján won the Democratic primary, defeating five other candidates. His closest competitor, developer Don Wiviott, received 26 percent to Luján's 42 percent.

Luján faced Republican Dan East and independent Carol Miller in the general election and won with 57% of the vote to East's 30% and Miller's 13%.

2010 

Luján won reelection against Republican nominee Thomas E. Mullins with 56.99% of the vote.

2012 

Luján won reelection against Republican nominee Jefferson Byrd with 63.12% of the vote.

2014 

Luján won reelection against Byrd again, with 61.52% of the vote.

2016 

Luján won reelection against Republican nominee Michael H. Romero with 62.42% of the vote.

2018 

Luján won reelection against Republican nominee Jerald Steve McFall with 63.4% of the vote.

Tenure
Luján has been a proponent of health care reform, including a public option. In October 2009, he gave a speech on the House floor calling for a public option to be included in the House health care bill.

In June 2009, Luján voted for an amendment that would require the United States Secretary of Defense to present a plan including a complete exit strategy for Afghanistan by the end of the year. The amendment did not pass. In September 2009, Luján wrote a letter urging the Obama administration not to increase the number of troops in Afghanistan. In his letter, he drew on conversations he had with General Stanley A. McChrystal and Afghan President Hamid Karzai.

In 2011, Luján was a co-sponsor of Bill , the Stop Online Piracy Act.

Energy policy
According to his campaign website, Luján has been active in environmental regulation. He chairs the Congressional Hispanic Caucus’ Green Economy and Renewable Energy Task Force. Luján has initiated several pieces of legislation regarding renewable energy such as the SOLAR Act. He co-authored the Community College Energy Training Act of 2009. He also supports natural gas usage and the New Alternative Transportations to Give Americans Solutions Act of 2009. Luján has high ratings from interest groups such as Environment America and the Sierra Club.

Luján serves on the bipartisan Congressional PFAS Task Force. He has introduced legislation to provide relief to communities and businesses impacted by PFAS/PFOA contamination in groundwater around Air Force bases in New Mexico and across the country.

In addition to supporting the Green New Deal, an economic stimulus package that aims to address climate change and economic inequality, Luján has developed legislation to put the United States on a path to net zero carbon emission and address climate change.

Education policy
Luján has been supported by the National Education Association. He supported the American Recovery and Reinvestment Act and student loan reform. He cosponsored the STEM Education Coordination Act in an effort to produce more scientists and innovators in the United States.

Luján has pressed the Federal Communications Commission (FCC) to bridge the digital divide to expand opportunities for rural communities. In 2018, he joined FCC Commissioner Jessica Rosenworcel on a bus ride where students learned to code during their drive time.

Native American issues
Luján has supported increased funding for the Bureau of Indian Affairs and Indian Health Service. He opposed the Stop the War on Coal Act of 2012 and was in favor of preserving sacred Native American ground. Luján worked to create legislation enabling tribes to directly request disaster assistance from the president. Luján's district contains 15 separate Pueblo tribes as well as tribal lands of the Jicarilla Apache Nation and Navajo Nation. In February 2009, Luján introduced a series of five water accessibility bills that, along with improving access to water for the many communities in the district, would also give federal funds to Indian tribes. Along with Harry Teague (D-NM) and Ann Kirkpatrick (D-AZ), Luján sponsored an amendment to the House health care bill that would extend the current Indian Health Care system until 2025. Tribal governments were major donors to his 2012 reelection campaign.

Luján has worked with the New Mexico Congressional Delegation to protect the greater Chaco Canyon region from oil and gas drilling and methane emissions. He participated in a Congressional Delegation visit to Chaco Canyon and Santa Fe, New Mexico, in May 2019, to study the effects of methane emissions on sacred sites.

Committee assignments
Committee on Energy and Commerce
Subcommittee on Communications and Technology
Subcommittee on Health
Subcommittee on Digital Commerce and Consumer Protection
Select Committee on the Climate Crisis

Caucus memberships
Congressional Arts Caucus
Congressional Hispanic Caucus

U.S. Senate

Elections

2020

On April 1, 2019, Luján announced he was running to succeed retiring Senator Tom Udall in the 2020 election. On June 2, 2020, Luján won the Democratic primary unopposed. He defeated Republican nominee Mark Ronchetti in the general election 51.7% to 45.6%.

Tenure

117th Congress (2021–present)
Luján was sworn into the Senate on January 3, 2021. He was accompanied by the outgoing Senator, Tom Udall.

On January 6, 2021, he was participating in the certification of the 2021 United States Electoral College vote count when Trump supporters stormed the U.S. Capitol. He called the attack a "siege" and "a direct attack on our nation's democracy." In the wake of the attack, Luján said he would vote to convict Trump "for inciting an insurrection."

Energy
In February 2021, Luján was one of seven Democratic U.S. Senators to join Republicans in blocking a ban of hydraulic fracturing, commonly known as fracking.

Committee assignments 
Luján served on the following Senate committees in the 118th United States Congress:
 Committee on Agriculture, Nutrition & Forestry
 Subcommittee on Commodities, Risk Management, and Trade
 Subcommittee on Conservation, Climate, Forestry, and Natural Resources
 Subcommittee on Rural Development and Energy
 Committee on the Budget
 Committee on Commerce, Science and Transportation
 Subcommittee on Communications, Media, and Broadband (Chair)
 Subcommittee on Consumer Protection, Product Safety, and Data Security
 Subcommittee on Oceans, Fisheries, Climate Change and Manufacturing
 Subcommittee on Space and Science
 Committee on Health, Education, Labor and Pensions
Subcommittee on Employment and Workplace Safety
Subcommittee on Primary Health and Retirement Security
 Committee on Indian Affairs

Personal life 
Luján is a Catholic.

On January 27, 2022, Luján was hospitalized in Santa Fe after feeling fatigued and dizzy. He was found to have had a stroke affecting his cerebellum and was transferred to the University of New Mexico Hospital for treatment, which included a decompressive craniectomy. A statement from his office said that "he is expected to make a full recovery". Luján returned to work at the Senate on March 3 and stated by April 21 that he was 90% recovered.

Electoral history

See also
 List of Hispanic and Latino Americans in the United States Congress

References

External links

Ben R. Luján official U.S. Senate website
Ben R. Luján for U.S. Senate 

 

|-

|-

|-

|-

|-

1972 births
21st-century American politicians
American politicians of Mexican descent
Catholics from New Mexico
Democratic Party members of the United States House of Representatives from New Mexico
Democratic Party United States senators from New Mexico
Hispanic and Latino American members of the United States Congress
Living people
American Roman Catholics
Ben R.
New Mexico Highlands University alumni
People from Nambé Pueblo, New Mexico
People from Santa Fe, New Mexico